Abdullahi Ahmed Addow is a Somali politician and diplomat.

Early life
Addow was born on 15 May 1936 in Brava, situated in the southeastern Lower Shabelle region of Somalia. He hails from the Habar Gidir sub-clan of the Hawiye.

Career

Ambassador and Finance Minister

Between 1970 and 1980 and again from 1986 to 1988, he served as Somalia's Ambassador to the United States. From 1980 to 1984, he was also Minister of Finance of Somalia.

Presidential candidate
Addow has thrice run for President of Somalia. In 2000, during the Somali peace process held in Arta, Djibouti, he was defeated in the third ballot by the eventual winner, former Interior Minister Abdiqasim Salad Hassan. Addow received 92 votes against Hassan's 145.

In 2004, Addow again for office in that year's presidential elections, losing 189–79 in the third round to former Puntland President, Abdullahi Yusuf Ahmed. In mid-2012, Addow ran once more for president in Somalia's 2012 elections.

References

1936 births
Living people
Ethnic Somali people
Finance ministers of Somalia
Government ministers of Somalia
Governors of Central Bank of Somalia
Ambassadors of Somalia to the United States
Somalian diplomats